Kathleen Wilhoite (born June 29, 1964) is an American actress and musician. She made her feature film debut in Private School (1983) before having a leading role in Murphy's Law (1986), followed by supporting parts in Witchboard (also 1986), Crossing Delancey (1988), Road House (1989), and Lorenzo's Oil (1992). She also had notable guest-starring roles on several series during this time, including Twin Peaks (1990).

Beginning in 1994, Wilhoite appeared as Chloe Lewis in a recurring guest-starring role on the series ER, and voiced the role of the titular character on the ABC animated series Pepper Ann (1997–2000). Other notable film roles during the 1990s include the science fiction thriller Fire in the Sky (1993), and the survival film The Edge (1997).

In 2003, she was cast in a recurring role as Liz Danes on Gilmore Girls, and has subsequently had guest-starring roles on Criminal Minds (2008), Grey's Anatomy (2009), and Jane the Virgin (2015). In 2019, Wilhoite guest-starred on an episode of the Netflix series The OA.

Early life
Kathleen Wilhoite was born June 29, 1964 in Santa Barbara, California. She began acting in theatrical productions as a child with the Santa Barbara Youth Theatre. She attended the University of Southern California before studying acting at the Lee Strasberg Institute in Los Angeles.

Career

1983–1997: Early work
Wilhoite made her film debut in Private School (1983), and the same year appeared in the television film Quarterback Princess. She subsequently had guest roles on the television series The Jeffersons and Cagney & Lacey (both 1985). In 1986, she had a lead role in the film Murphy's Law, directed by J. Lee Thompson, as well as a supporting part as a psychic in the supernatural horror film Witchboard.

Wilhoite starred in two theatrical productions for New York City's Second Stage Theater in 1987: Division Street and Moonchildren. For her performance in the latter, critic Frank Rich of The New York Times praised her "frisky comic style" and likened her to "Shirley MacLaine in that star's earliest show-biz incarnation." Wilhoite also provided the voice of Cathy Andrews in the CBS animated TV special Cathy (1987) based on the comic strips by Cathy Guisewite which the show won a primetime Emmy for outstanding animated program, and its two sequels; Cathy's Last Resort (1988) and Cathy's Valentine (1989). This was followed by supporting film roles in Angel Heart (1987), the comedy Crossing Delancey (1988), and a lead role in the British-set horror film Dream Demon (also 1988), opposite Jemma Redgrave. Next, Wilhoite appeared in the Patrick Swayze-starring Road House (1989), Curtis Hanson's neo-noir Bad Influence (1990), and the drama Lorenzo's Oil (1992). She also appeared on television, portraying a resident of the titular town in David Lynch's series Twin Peaks in 1990.

Between 1993 and 1994, Wilhoite appeared in the seventh and eight seasons of L.A. Law as Rosalie Hendrickson Stulwicz. Beginning in 1994, she was cast in a recurring guest role as Chloe Lewis on ER, a role she continued to play for the following eight years. In 1995, she won a Q Award for her performance on the series, in the category of Outstanding Specialty Player by the Viewers for Quality Television. In film, Wilhoite portrayed the wife of a man who experiences alien abduction in Fire in the Sky (1993), followed by supporting parts in the drama Color of Night (1994) and the survival thriller The Edge (1997), starring Anthony Hopkins and Alec Baldwin.

1998–2010: Film and television
Wilhoite provided the voice of the titular character of the Disney animated series Pepper Ann, a role she began in 1997 and portrayed until the series' conclusion in 2000. In 2000, she appeared in several feature films, including the dark comedies Nurse Betty and Drowning Mona, as well as the drama Pay It Forward.

In the early 2000s, Wilhoite guest-starred on several series, including a voice role in Family Guy (2001), 24 (2002) and Will & Grace (2003). Beginning in late 2003, Wilhoite guest-starred in a recurring role on the series Gilmore Girls, portraying Liz Danes, the mother of Jess Mariano (Milo Ventimiglia).

In May 2006, Wilhoite wrote and performed a one-woman show, Stop Yellin''', directed by Kathy Najimy. The show consisted of autobiographical monologues and performances of songs from her albums.. She subsequently had a supporting part in the comedy King of California (2007), starring Michael Douglas and Evan Rachel Wood. Guest-starring television credits in the late 2000s included Criminal Minds (2008) and Grey's Anatomy (2009).

Wilhoite has also narrated a number of audiobooks, including Maria Semple's Where'd You Go, Bernadette and Today Will Be Different.

2011–present: Later roles
In 2013, Wilhoite had a supporting part in the romantic comedy Crazy Kind of Love, followed by a central role in the independent drama A Sort of Homecoming (2015). Also in 2015, she guest-starred on the comedy series Jane the Virgin, followed by a guest role on the fantasy series Kevin (Probably) Saves the World in 2018. Beginning in 2018, she provided the voice of Sue Peltzer in the Cartoon Network animated series Summer Camp Island, and in 2019 had a guest-starring role on the Netflix series The OA.

Music
As a musician, Wilhoite released two albums, Pitch Like a Girl (1997, Daves' Record Company) and Shiva (2000, Ruby Ray Records). Her songs have been in such films as Murphy's Law (1986), which she also starred in; her songs have also appeared in Roadhouse (1989), Valerie Flake (1999), East of A (2000), and Touched by an Angel (2000), as well as on the television series Buffy the Vampire Slayer. ("Wish We Never Met" from Pitch Like a Girl'' appeared in the season three episode "Consequences".)

Personal life
Wilhoite married musician David Harte in 1997, with whom she has two children; a son, James, and a daughter, Ruby. In the early 2010s, Wilhoite and Harte adopted a son named Adu from Ethiopia.

Filmography

Film

Television

Stage credits

Discography

References

External links

 
 
 Interview with Kathleen Wilhoite December 13, 2013

1964 births
Living people
20th-century American actresses
21st-century American actresses
Actresses from Los Angeles
Actresses from Santa Barbara, California
American women guitarists
American women singers
American film actresses
American stage actresses
American voice actresses
American television actresses
Lee Strasberg Theatre and Film Institute alumni
Musicians from Santa Barbara, California
Singers from California
University of Southern California alumni